Olive Lewin OD OM (28 September 1927 – 10 April 2013) was a Jamaican author, social anthropologist, musicologist, and teacher. She is best known for her recorded anthologies of old Jamaica folk songs, researched and collected over her lifetime.

Biography
Olive Lewin was born in Vere, in Clarendon, Jamaica, to teachers. She studied music and ethnomusicology in the United Kingdom. She is a Fellow of Trinity College, London, and an Associate of the Royal Academy of Music and the Royal School of Music. She also held the position of Director of Arts and Culture at the office of the Prime Minister of Jamaica as well as that of Director of the Jamaica Institute of Folk Culture. From 1983 she directed the Jamaica Orchestra for Youth. 

Lewin was the author of several books and has made numerous recordings of folk music, performed by the Jamaican Folk Singers, which she founded. She was honoured by the Government of Jamaica, the United Nations, the Organization of American States, the Government of France and by academia for her outstanding lifelong contribution to the arts. In 2001 she was awarded the Jamaican Order of Distinction.

She preferred to present her collections of old Jamaican folk songs through concerts, and useful recordings are difficult to find.  Some of her collected folk songs can be found on the internet but most of the few original recordings are very difficult to find since the original reel-to-reel tapes have deteriorated and the 33rpm records are now scarce. In 1987 she was awarded the Musgrave Gold Medal by the Institute of Jamaica.

Death
Lewin died in a Kingston hospital on 10 April 2013. She was 85. She was given a State funeral at the University Chapel in St Andrew on Saturday, 27 August 2013. Her body was interred in the churchyard of the St James Anglican Church in Hayes, Clarendon. Edward Seaga tribute to her was as follows-

Quote

"I asked her to take up the assignment of collecting the folk music that was not yet recorded so as to complete the inventory of our musical soul," said Seaga. "She set about the task with a fervent mission. Every parish was her stomping ground. After several years of compiling a rich collection, she completed that phase of her mission. The next phase was the performance of the music, to open the door wider to this cultural wonderland."

"I wish, [and] I could feel it in my heart, that she was fully recognized in her own life," said Seaga, breaking into tears as his wife Carla moved to comfort him at the podium.
"She goes to her grave only partly covered in the glory she deserves.

"But God knows this woman of grace, this missionary of our music, this cultural ambassador was a heavenly icon, and he will do the rest to grace her soul as she deserves," Seaga continued, bidding condolence to Lewin's family.

In October 2013 Lewin was posthumously awarded the Order of Merit by the Jamaican government.

Legacy
Olive Lewin Heritage Foundation was dedicated to Dr. Olive Lewin on Saturday, 31 May 2014, starting at 4:30 p.m., at The Steele Auditorium, Nova Southeastern University, Law Center, located at 3200 South University Drive in Davie, Florida. It was launched by Edward Seaga, former Prime Minister, who had worked extensively in the preservation of Jamaican folk culture, with Olive Lewin.

Works by Olive Lewin
Alle, Alle, Alle: 12 Jamaican Folk Songs (London: Oxford UP) 1977. Music scores incl. 
Beeny Budd: 12 Jamaican Folk-songs for Children (London: Oxford UP) 1975.
Brown Gal in the Ring: 12 Jamaican Folk Songs, Collected and Arranged for Schools (London: Oxford UP), 1974. 
Dandy Shandy: 12 Folk-songs for children (London: Oxford UP), 1975. Folklore. Music. Songs. Jamaica. 
Forty Folk Songs of Jamaica (Washington, DC: OAS), 107 pp., 1 map, 1973.
Some Jamaican Folk Songs (Kingston: Oxford Group Publishers), 1970. A collection of 36 folk songs, including scores.
"Mento", in The New Grove Dictionary of Music and Musicians, 2nd edition, vol. 16, pp. 435–6 (London: Macmillan Publishers), 2001.
Rock It Come Over: the Folk Music of Jamaica (Kingston: University of the West Indies Press), 2000. Map, Illustrations, Foreword, Introduction, Preface, Acknowledgments, References, Indexes, and chapters as follows:

I. Introduction
1. The Making of a Musician
2. Slavery:
3. Conflicting Concepts of Wealth

II. Non-Cult Traditional Jamaican Music
4. Music for Work, Play and the Spirit
5. Mento and Other Styles for Dance, Entertainment and Ceremony

III. Cults and Cult Music in Jamaica
6. Maroon, Tambo, Goombeh, Ettu, Nago
7. Revivalism and Rastafarianism

IV. Kumina and Queenie Kennedy
8. The Kumina Cult
9. Queenie Kennedy: Her Life
10. Queenie Kennedy: Her Teachings and Her Work
11. Conclusion

References

External links
 YouTube 

1927 births
2013 deaths
People from Clarendon Parish, Jamaica
Alumni of the Royal Academy of Music
Jamaican non-fiction writers
Jamaican women writers
Recipients of the Order of Distinction
Recipients of the Musgrave Medal